Small Town Hero or Small Town Heroes may refer to:

"Small Town Hero" (song), a song by Sawyer Brown from their album This Thing Called Wantin' and Havin' It All
Small Town Heroes, studio album by Hurray for the Riff Raff
Small Town Hero EP, 2012 EP by English indie/ska, new tone band Heavyball